The Berryville Gymnasium is a historic school building, located in a large school complex on the west side of Berryville, Arkansas.  It is a single-story stone masonry structure, with a gable-on-hip roof.  It is taller to accommodate the height of the gymnasium within, and has a second row of windows across some facades to provide added illumination into that facility.  The building was constructed in 1936–37 with funding assistance from the Works Progress Administration.

The building was listed on the National Register of Historic Places in 1992.

See also
National Register of Historic Places listings in Carroll County, Arkansas

References

School buildings on the National Register of Historic Places in Arkansas
Buildings and structures in Berryville, Arkansas
National Register of Historic Places in Carroll County, Arkansas